The 1936 United States presidential election in Iowa took place on November 3, 1936, as part of the 1936 United States presidential election. Iowa voters chose 11 representatives, or electors, to the Electoral College, who voted for president and vice president.

Iowa was won by incumbent President Franklin D. Roosevelt (D–New York), running with Vice President John Nance Garner, with 54.41% of the popular vote, against Governor Alf Landon (R–Kansas), running with Frank Knox, with 42.70% of the popular vote. As of the 2020 presidential election, this is the last occasion when Sioux County, Lyon County and O'Brien County have voted for a Democratic Presidential candidate.

Results

Results by county

See also
 United States presidential elections in Iowa

References

Iowa
1936
1936 Iowa elections